Robey Theatre is a historic theater located at Spencer, Roane County, West Virginia. It was built in 1907 and extensively remodeled in 1926.  It is a three-story, five bay wide Neoclassical / Italian Renaissance style building. The front facade features a large central entrance bay, with a ticket booth flanked on both sides by two sets of double doors. Above the entrance is a marquee anchored to the second floor by chains and distinctive neon sign above.  It is the oldest continuously operating movie theater in the United States.

The Robey Theatre is currently owned by Aaron and Melissa Richardson.

It was listed on the National Register of Historic Places on March 29, 1989.

References

External links

Robey Theatre website

Theatres on the National Register of Historic Places in West Virginia
Neoclassical architecture in West Virginia
Theatres completed in 1911
Buildings and structures in Roane County, West Virginia
National Register of Historic Places in Roane County, West Virginia
Italian Renaissance Revival architecture in the United States
1911 establishments in West Virginia